The Miami Marlins are a Major League Baseball (MLB) franchise based in Miami, Florida. They play in the National League East division. The first game of the new baseball season for a team is played on Opening Day, and being named the Opening Day starter is an honor, which is often given to the player who is expected to lead the pitching staff that season, though there are various strategic reasons why a team's best pitcher might not start on Opening Day. The Marlins have used 17 different Opening Day starting pitchers in their 27 seasons. Notably, no Marlins Opening Day starter received a no-decision until the team's 24th season in 2016. No-decisions are only awarded to the starting pitcher if the game is won or lost after the starting pitcher has left the game.

Nine Marlins pitchers have started on two or more Opening Days. Those nine are Charlie Hough, Kevin Brown, Alex Fernandez, Ryan Dempster, Josh Beckett, Dontrelle Willis, Josh Johnson, Ricky Nolasco, and José Ureña. When playing at their original home field, the venue now known as Hard Rock Stadium, the Marlins had a record of nine wins and five losses (9–5). At their current home of Marlins Park, Opening Day pitchers have a record of 1–5 with one no-decision. In the franchise's history, the Marlins have only played Opening Day games at another team's home stadium eight times. As the away team, Marlins' starting pitchers have an Opening Day record of 1–6 with one no-decision.

This streak was sandwiched by the Marlins' two longest Opening Day losing streaks for starting pitchers, each at three losses.

Key

Pitchers

References 

Opening
Miami Marlins Opening Day starting pitchers